Valmiera Glass Vidzemes Augstskola (Valmiera Glass ViA, also stylized Valmiera Glass/ViA) is a basketball club based in Valmiera, Latvia, playing in the Latvian–Estonian Basketball League. Originally a student club of  Vidzeme University of Applied Sciences (Vidzemes Augstskola), Valmiera started playing in the Latvian Basketball League's third division in 2011, and expanded its roster to include semi-professional and fully professional players. In 2018, the team was promoted to the Latvian–Estonian Basketball League, the newly formed combined top basketball division of Latvia and Estonia, after bankruptcy of the former Latvian champion club Valmiera/Ordo. The head coach of Valmiera Glass ViA is Lithuanian Tomas Keršis.

History
The club was founded in 2009 as a student club of Vidzeme University. It debuted in 2011 in the Latvian Basketball League's third division as Vidzemes Augstskola. With Roberts Zeile as player coach and Sandis Amoliņš in roster, the team won the division championship in spring of 2012 and was promoted to second division. In 2012, Oto Grīnbergs joined the team and became focal point in team's offence, managing to be leading scorer for next five seasons.

In 2014, the team began a partnership with Valmiera Fibreglass and played as "Vidzemes Augstskola/Valmiera Glass". It had also established a farm team "Vidzemes Augstskola/Valmiera Glass-2" which played in LBL's third division. In 2016, the football club Valmieras FK and the basketball club were brought together under the organization name " Valmiera Glass / Vidzemes Augstskola" or "Valmiera Glass ViA".

Gradually, the club rose in second division rankings, and made a finals appearance in 2017, where they lost to BK Jelgava. That sparked discussion of Valmiera Glass ViA joining the Latvian Basketball League's highest division. In 2018 Valmiera Glass ViA lost second division bronze medal series to BK Gulbenes Buki, finishing in fourth place, but due to Valmiera city rival club Valmiera/Ordo bankruptcy  Valmiera Glass ViA was promoted to newly founded Latvian–Estonian Basketball League.

Before 2018/2019 season professional Valmiera basketball players Jānis Kaufmanis, Edmunds Elksnis and Māris Ziediņš joined Valmiera Glass ViA. In regular season, the team's record was 8-20, finishing 12th place overall and 6th among Latvian teams. Although it missed the Latvian-Estonian playoffs, the team qualified for the Latvian playoffs and played in the quarterfinal series against BK Ogre, where they lost the series 0-3.

In the summer of 2022, club announced that famous Latvian national team players and brothers Dairis Bertāns and Dāvis Bertāns have become members of the board. Club has a strong bond with Bertans' Basketball School in the city of Valmiera.

Roster

Current roster

Depth chart

Retired numbers

Season by season

Notable players

 Sandis Amoliņš
 Jānis Kaufmanis
 Edmunds Elksnis
 Māris Ziediņš
 Viktors Iļjins

See also 
 Valmieras FK, the related football club with the same logo
 BK Valmiera, previous Valmiera basketball team

References

External links 
  

Basketball in Latvia
Basketball teams in Latvia
Valmiera